Clarence Herbert Hall (18 January 1890 – 3 September 1976) was an Australian rules footballer who played in the VFL between 1912 and 1922 and then one game in 1924 for the Richmond Football Club.

References

External links

Richmond Football Club – Hall of Fame

Richmond Football Club players
Richmond Football Club Premiership players
Prahran Football Club players
Leopold Football Club (MJFA) players
Australian rules footballers from Melbourne
1890 births
1976 deaths
Two-time VFL/AFL Premiership players